J. T. Wall (born September 12, 1979) is an American football fullback. Wall attended John Milledge Academy in Milledgeville, GA, where he was a four-year starter at linebacker and fullback. After graduating high school in 1998, he moved on to Southwest Baptist University prior to transferring to the University of Georgia. Wall was taken in the seventh round of the NFL draft by the Pittsburgh Steelers. After a short lived professional career, he now is the Head Football Coach at his old high school John Milledge Academy and has led them to two straight Region Championship titles (2012 and 2013) and a state AAA Championship in 2016,2019,2020,and 2021

References

External links
 "Steelers tap Ivan Taylor, Brian St. Pierre, J.T. Wall to wrap NFL Draft Day 2 " - Post Gazette
 "Bulldog Fullback J.T. Wall Awarded Scholarship" - Dawg Post
 "GEORGIA VS. GEORGIA TECH: Q &A / FULLBACK J.T. WALL: 'I never thought it would happen'" - AJC
 "Hit me with your best shot" - Online Athens
 "Walk-ons keep a Georgia tradition alive and well" - ESPN
 "Steelers sign picks" - Lodi News Sentinel

1979 births
Living people
Southwest Baptist University alumni
Southwest Baptist Bearcats football players
American football fullbacks
Georgia Bulldogs football players
University of Georgia alumni
Indianapolis Colts players
People from Milledgeville, Georgia
Players of American football from Georgia (U.S. state)
Pittsburgh Steelers players